Alice Lake (September 12, 1895 – November 15, 1967) was an American film actress. She began her career during the silent film era and often appeared in comedy shorts opposite Roscoe Arbuckle.

Career
Born in Brooklyn, New York, Lake began her career as a dancer. She made her screen debut in 1912, and she appeared in a number of comedy shorts by Mack Sennett. Lake was often the leading lady of Roscoe Arbuckle in comedies like Oh Doctor! (1917) and The Cook (1918). Arbuckle directed both films and was joined by Buster Keaton who had a leading role in Oh Doctor!.

Lake also played dramatic roles with Bert Lytell in Blackie's Redemption and The Lion's Den, both from 1919. During the 1920s she appeared in a number of Metro silent film features as the lead actress. At the height of her career she earned $1,200 per week as a motion picture actress. Lake had only limited success in dramatic roles. Following the introduction of talkies, her parts in films began to wane and she only performed in supporting roles. Her last appearance in film was in 1935 with a bit part in Frisco Kid. In all her screen credits numbered ninety-six.

Personal life
In March 1924, Lake married fellow actor Robert Williams, but they were divorced in 1925. The couple separated and reunited three times before they permanently separated. Williams was a vaudeville performer who had appeared in a number of stage plays. He was previously married to singer Marion Harris. She is the aunt of Filipina actress Anita Linda.

Death
Lake died of a heart attack at Paradise Sanitarium in Hollywood, California. She was 72. She is buried at Valhalla Memorial Park Cemetery in North Hollywood.

For her contribution to the motion picture industry, Alice Lake has a star on the Hollywood Walk of Fame at 1620 Vine Street.

Selected filmography
{| class="wikitable sortable"
|-
! Year
! Title
! Role
! class="unsortable" | Notes
|-
|1916
|The Moonshiners
|Lady Jocelyn
|
|-
|1916
|The Waiters' Ball
|A Fair Customer
|
|-
|1916
|A Creampuff Romance
|
|Alternative title: His Alibi
|-
|1916
|The Grab Bag Bride
|
|
|-
|1917
| The Butcher Boy 
|
|Uncredited
|-
|1917
|A Reckless Romeo
|Wife
|Alternative title: A Creampuff Romance
|-
|1917
|The Rough House
|Mrs. Rough
|
|-
|1917
|His Wedding Night
|
|
|-
|1917
|The Texas Sphinx
|
|
|-
|1917
|Coney Island
|Undetermined Role
|Uncredited
|-
|1917
|A Country Hero
|Schoolteacher
| Lost film
|-
|1918
|Out West
|Salvation Army Woman
|Alternative title: The Sheriff
|-
|1918
|The Bell Boy
|Cutie Cuticle, manicurist
|
|-
|1918
|Moonshine
|Moonshiner's Daughter
| 
|-
|1918
|Good Night, Nurse!
|Crazy Woman
|
|-
|1919
| Camping Out
|
|
|-
|1919
|The Lion's Den
| Dorothy Stedman
|
|-
|1919
|A Desert Hero
|
| Lost film
|-
|1919
|Lombardi, Ltd.
| Norah Blake
|
|-
|1919
|Blackie's Redemption
|Mary Dawson
|
|-
|1919
|Full of Pep
|Felicia Bocaz
|
|-
| 1920 
| The Misfit Wife 
| Katie Malloy
| 
|-
|1920
|The Garage
|Undetermined Role
|Uncredited
|-
|1921
|The Hole in the Wall
| Jean Oliver
| Lost film
|-
| 1921
| Over the Wire 
| Kathleen Dexter
|
|-
|1922
|More to Be Pitied Than Scorned
|Viola Lorraine
| Lost film
|-
| 1922
| Environment
| Sally 'Chicago Sal' Dolan
|-
|1922
|I Am the Law
|Joan Cameron
| Unknown/presumably lost
|-
|1923
|Broken Hearts of Broadway
|Bubbles Revere
|
|-
|1923
| Modern Matrimony 
|Patricia Waddington
|
|-
|1923
|The Unknown Purple
|Jewel Marchmont
|
|-
| 1924
|The Law and the Lady 
| Marion Blake 
| 
|-
| 1924
|  The Dancing Cheat 
|'Poppy' Marie Andrews
|
|-
| 1925 
| The Price of Success 
| Ellen Harden
|
|-
| 1926
| Broken Homes 
|Arline
| 
|-
| 1926
| The Truth About Men'
|Dora
|
|-
| 1926
|The Wives of the Prophet 
| Judith
|
|-
| 1926
| The Hurricane 
|The Wife
|
|-
|1927
|The Angel of Broadway|Goldie
| Lost film
|-
| 1927
|  Roaring Fires 
|Sylvia Summers
| Lost film
|-
|1928
|Runaway Girls|Agnes Brady
| Lost film
|-
| 1929
| Untamed Justice| Ann
| 
|-
|1934
|The Girl from Missouri|Paige's Manicurist
|Uncredited
|-
|1934
|Babes in Toyland|Townswoman
|Uncredited
|-
|1935
|Frisco Kid|Undetermined Role
|Uncredited
|}

Footnotes

References
 Los Angeles Times, "Another Romance Of Films On Rocks", March 16, 1925, Page 20.
 Los Angeles Times'', "Ex-Actress Alice Lake Dies at 71", November 17, 1967, Page 29.

Further reading

External links

 
 Alice Lake at Virtual History

Actresses from New York (state)
American film actresses
American silent film actresses
Burials at Valhalla Memorial Park Cemetery
People from Brooklyn
Western (genre) film actresses
1895 births
1967 deaths
20th-century American actresses